The Princess of Wales Hospital is a district general hospital in Bridgend, Wales. It is managed by Cwm Taf Morgannwg University Health Board.

History
The hospital was commissioned to replace the aging Bridgend General Hospital. The new hospital, which was designed by Holder Mathias, was officially opened by the Princess of Wales on 11 June 1986. The George Thomas Scanner Suite was subsequently opened by the Princess of Wales and Viscount Tonypandy in February 1990.

Services
The Surgical Materials Testing Laboratory, which provides testing and technical services to the Welsh NHS on medical devices, is based at the hospital.

The South Wales Child and Adolescent Mental Health Services unit, Ty Llidiard, is on the site of the hospital.

Performance
In May 2014, staff at the hospital was criticised in a report into the death of an elderly patient who had been treated at the hospital; the report found that there had been "variable or poor professional behaviour and practice in the care of frail older people".

The Healthcare Inspectorate Wales carried out a mental health unit review in April 2015 and raised concerns about "insufficient staffing levels to maintain safe levels of care" and "concerns around a specific patient for which there was inadequate recording of fluid intake and a care and treatment plan which did not adequately address the area of diabetes and an absence of any care strategy in relation to this area".

Uniforms
Trinny Woodall and Susannah Constantine re-designed the uniforms of the catering department as part of their ITV show, Trinny & Susannah Undress the Nation. The episode was broadcast on 18 December 2007.

Radio 
Bridgend's Hospital Radio (BHR) provides the hospital radio service at the hospital.

The hospital radio is run by volunteers and features a variety of programming. The station is available to be listened live at the Princess of Wales Hospital and via an online stream.

The station has received nominations at the Hospital Broadcasting Association Awards. For the 2022 award season, Bridgend's Hospital Radio received a nomination for Best Specialist Music Programme and presenter Connor Morgans won Gold for Male Presenter of the Year.

References

External links

Hospital buildings completed in 1985
NHS hospitals in Wales
Hospitals in Bridgend County Borough
Hospitals established in 1985
1985 establishments in the United Kingdom
Cwm Taf Morgannwg University Health Board